Colona poilanei is a species of flowering plant in the Malvaceae sensu lato (previously placed in the Tiliaceae or Sparrmanniaceae). family.
It is endemic to Vietnam, (VN name: Chông) where it is described as a near-threatened small pioneer tree found in areas of lowland secondary, disturbed and recolonising tropical forest.

References

External links

Grewioideae
Endemic flora of Vietnam
Trees of Vietnam
Near threatened plants
Taxonomy articles created by Polbot